Rescue Me may refer to:

Film and television
 Rescue Me (film), a 1993 film starring Michael Dudikoff
 Rescue Me: Mave-chan, a 2005 original video animation by Studio Fantasia
 Rescue Me (American TV series), a 2004–2011 drama series starring Denis Leary
 Rescue Me (British TV series), a 2002 romantic comedy series
 "Rescue Me" (Cheers), a television episode
 "Rescue Me" (Diagnosis: Murder), a television episode
 "Rescue Me" (The Vampire Diaries), a television episode

Literature
 Rescue Me, a 2008 romantic fiction anthology by Cherry Adair, Lora Leigh, and Cindy Gerard
 Rescue Me, a 2012 novel by Rachel Gibson
 Rescue Me, a 2011 novel by Christopher Hart

Music

Albums
 Rescue Me (soundtrack), from the American TV series, 2006
 Rescue Me, by John Rich, 2001
 Rescue Me, by Roy Buchanan, 1974

Songs
 "Rescue Me" (Bell, Book & Candle song), 1997
 "Rescue Me" (EuroGroove song), 1995
 "Rescue Me" (Fontella Bass song), 1965; covered by many performers
 "Rescue Me" (Freak of Nature song), 1993
 "Rescue Me" (Madonna song), 1991
 "Rescue Me" (Marshmello song), 2019
 "Rescue Me" (OneRepublic song), 2019
 "Rescue Me" (Skepta song), 2010
 "Rescue Me" (Thirty Seconds to Mars song), 2018
 "Rescue Me" (Ultra song), 1999
 "Rescue Me" (You Me at Six song), 2011
 "Rescue Me"/"Smile Again", by Every Little Thing, 2000
 "SOS (Rescue Me)", by Rihanna, 2006
 "Rescue Me", by Al B. Sure! from In Effect Mode, 1988
 "Rescue Me", by the Alarm from Eye of the Hurricane, 1987
 "Rescue Me", by Black Stone Cherry from Kentucky, 2016
 "Rescue Me", by Buckcherry from Black Butterfly, 2008
 "Rescue Me", by Daughtry from Break the Spell, 2011
 "Rescue Me", by Hawthorne Heights from Fragile Future, 2008
 "Rescue Me", by the Hooters
 "Rescue Me", by Myka Relocate from The Young Souls, 2015
 "Rescue Me", by Pushmonkey from Year of the Monkey, 2005
 "Rescue Me", by Slaughterhouse from Welcome to: Our House, 2012
 "Rescue Me", by A Taste of Honey from Twice As Sweet, 1980
 "Rescue Me", by Tokio Hotel from Scream, 2007
 "Rescue Me", by Y&T from Earthshaker, 1981
 "Rescue Me", by Zebrahead from MFZB, 2003

See also
 Rette mich (disambiguation)
 Save Me (disambiguation)